is a TV station affiliated with Fuji News Network (FNN) and Fuji Network System (FNS) in Morioka, Iwate.

The station functions as a default FNN affiliate for neighboring Aomori Prefecture, which does not have a Fuji Television-affiliated station of its own.

History
JOYH-DTV began broadcasting on 1 April 1991 as JOYH-TV (channel 33), becoming the first dedicated affiliate of FNN (Fuji Television) in the northeastern portion of Tōhoku (the license had been awarded back in December 1989, but the station's construction began in the spring of 1990). Prior to the station's signon, JODF-TV carried FNN as a secondary affiliation, while some cable providers in Iwate Prefecture carried JOOX-TV, which was receivable over the air in the prefecture's extreme southern reaches.

Digital broadcasting began on 1 July 2006, and was expected to continue until July 2011. The 11 March 2011 earthquake resulted in the postponement of the shutdown date for all analog television signals in Iwate, Miyagi, and Fukushima prefectures. The station finally shut down its analog television service on 31 March 2012.

TV channels

Digital Television 
Morioka 20ch　JOYH-DTV 1 kW

Translators 
Ninohe 50ch 100W
Ichinoseki 29ch 25W
Yachiyama 34ch 2W
Tōno 19ch 20W
Ōtsuchi-shinyama 47ch 2W
Murone 29ch 3W
Kamaishi 16ch 30W
Miyako 16ch 20W
Ōfunato 16ch 10W
Kuji 46ch 3W
Nishine-Matsuo 34ch 2W
Ōtsushi 16ch 1W
Noda 46ch 1W

Program

External links
 The official website of Iwate Menkoi Television 

Fuji News Network
Television stations in Japan
Television channels and stations established in 1991
Mass media in Morioka, Iwate
1991 establishments in Japan